Alias 'La Gringa' is a 1991 Peruvian drama film directed by Alberto Durant. The film was selected as the Peruvian entry for the Best Foreign Language Film at the 64th Academy Awards, but was not accepted as a nominee. El Frontón is the main setting for the film.

Cast
 Germán González as La Gringa
 Elsa Olivero
 Orlando Sacha
 Juan Manuel Ochoa
 Enrique Victoria
 Gonzalo de Miguel
 Ramón García
 Aristóteles Picho

See also
 List of submissions to the 64th Academy Awards for Best Foreign Language Film
 List of Peruvian submissions for the Academy Award for Best Foreign Language Film

References

External links
 

1991 films
1991 drama films
1990s Peruvian films
1990s Spanish-language films
Peruvian drama films